Henry Cook (23 October 1893 – 9 January 1917) was an English professional footballer who played as a wing half in the Football League for Middlesbrough. He also played for South Bank and appeared as a guest for Brentford during the First World War.

Personal life 
Prior to becoming a professional footballer, Cook was a teacher at Marton Road School and North Ormesby Junior Boys' School in Middlesbrough. After enlisting in January 1915, Cook served as a sergeant in the 12th (Service) Battalion of the Yorkshire Regiment during the First World War. He took part in the operations on the Ancre and was wounded in action by shellfire in early January 1917 while the battalion was engaged in road works in the vicinity of Maurepas, Somme. He died of his wounds on 9 January 1917 and was buried in Grove Town Cemetery, Méaulte. At the time of his death, Cook had been accepted for a commission and would have returned to England three days later to begin officer training. He left a wife and two children.

Career statistics

References

1893 births
1917 deaths
Military personnel from Yorkshire
Footballers from Middlesbrough
English footballers
South Bank F.C. players
Middlesbrough F.C. players
English Football League players
Northern Football League players
Association football wing halves
Brentford F.C. wartime guest players
Schoolteachers from Yorkshire
British military personnel killed in World War I
British Army personnel of World War I
Green Howards soldiers
Burials in Hauts-de-France